"When the Sun Comes Down" is a song by German Dance-Band R.I.O. The song was written by Yann Peifer, Manuel Reuter and Andres Ballinas. It was released in Germany as a digital download on 5 December 2008. In autumn 2017 the dutch DJ and producer Kaaze released a big room remix of the track as a free download. Due to its premier during Hardwell's radio show Hardwell On Air, the track became popular.

Track listing
UK Digital download
 "When the Sun Comes Down" (Radio Mix) – 3:22
 "When the Sun Comes Down" – 5:07
 "When the Sun Comes Down" (Spencer & Hill Radio Edit) – 3:32 
 "When the Sun Comes Down" (Spencer & Hill Remix) – 6:12 
 "When the Sun Comes Down" (Dirty Rush Live In Rio Radio Edit) – 3:37 
 "When the Sun Comes Down" (Dirty Rush Live In Rio Mix) – 7:14
 "When the Sun Comes Down" (Maddin Radio Edit) – 3:33
 "When the Sun Comes Down" (Maddin Remix) – 5:27 
 "When the Sun Comes Down" (Balearic Flava Mix) – 8:55

Credits and personnel
Lead vocals – Tony T.
Producers – Yann Peifer, Manuel Reuter
Lyrics – Yann Peifer, Manuel Reuter, Andres Ballinas
Label: Zooland Records

Charts

Weekly charts

Year-end charts

Release history

References

2008 singles
R.I.O. songs
Songs written by DJ Manian
Songs written by Yanou
2008 songs
Songs written by Andres Ballinas